Willian Henrique Antunes, known as Willian Magrão (born 16 February 1987), is a Brazilian footballer who plays for Portuguesa as a defensive midfielder.

Career
In December 2019, Magrão joined São Bernardo. However, he was yet to make his debut, before he joined Portuguesa on 21 February 2020.

Honours
Grêmio
Campeonato Gaúcho: 2007

References

External links

1987 births
Living people
Brazilian footballers
Brazilian expatriate footballers
Association football midfielders
Grêmio Foot-Ball Porto Alegrense players
Associação Atlética Ponte Preta players
Cruzeiro Esporte Clube players
Figueirense FC players
Associação Portuguesa de Desportos players
Boa Esporte Clube players
Red Bull Brasil players
Oita Trinita players
Kagoshima United FC players
Clube Náutico Capibaribe players
FC Juárez footballers
São Bernardo Futebol Clube players
Campeonato Brasileiro Série A players
Campeonato Brasileiro Série B players
Campeonato Brasileiro Série D players
Ascenso MX players
J2 League players
Brazilian expatriate sportspeople in Mexico
Brazilian expatriate sportspeople in Japan
Expatriate footballers in Mexico
Expatriate footballers in Japan
People from Mogi Mirim